MAL-like protein is a protein that in humans is encoded by the MALL gene.

This gene encodes an element of the machinery for raft-mediated trafficking in endothelial cells. The encoded protein, a member of the MAL proteolipid family, predominantly localizes in glycolipid- and cholesterol-enriched membrane (GEM) rafts. It interacts with caveolin-1.

References

Further reading